The Dutch basketball champions, are the winners of the highest level of basketball in the Netherlands, which is the BNXT League since 2022. This page is a list of winners and runners-up in each given DBL season, along with additional information.

Den Bosch has won a total number of 16 titles, the highest of any club. Currently, only four teams that have won championships are still active in the DBL: Den Bosch, Landstede Hammers, Leiden and Donar.

From 1945 to 2021, the Dutch basketball champion came from the Dutch Basketball League (formerly the Eredivisie). Since 2022, the champion is decided through the BNXT League; this league features Belgian teams as well but organises a playoffs to determine the Dutch champions.

Season summaries (1945–1977)

In the early years of the Eredivisie, a round-robin competition was played to determine the national champion. The team with the most wins was crowned champion.

DBL / BNXT Finals (1978–present)
In the 1977–78 Eredivisie season, the play-offs were introduced, along with finals which determined the winner of a given DBL season.

Playoffs finals performances by clubs

Teams in italic are inactive or dissolved.

Titles by club

Titles by province

Titles by city

Notes

References